The 2019 NCAA Division II Football Championship Game was a postseason college football game that determined a national champion in NCAA Division II for the 2019 season. It was played at McKinney ISD Stadium in McKinney, Texas, on December 21, 2019, with kickoff at 3:00 p.m. EST (2:00 p.m. local CST), and television coverage on ESPNU.

Teams
The participants of the 2019 NCAA Division II Football Championship Game were the finalists of the 2019 Division II Playoffs, which began with four 7-team brackets to determine super region champions, who then qualified for the national semifinals. The game featured the winners of those national semifinal games: No. 4 seed West Florida and No. 3 seed Minnesota State. This was the first meeting between the two teams. West Florida defeated Minnesota State, 48–40 to win the 2019 NCAA Division II Football Championship.

National semifinals
Super region champions were seeded 1 to 4 for the national semifinals.

Game summary

Statistics

References

Championship Game
NCAA Division II Football Championship Games
Minnesota State Mavericks football games
West Florida Argonauts football games
American football competitions in Texas
NCAA Division II Football Championship Game
NCAA Division II Football Championship Game
McKinney, Texas
Sports in Collin County, Texas